The Two Friends (Italian: I due compari) is a 1955 Italian comedy film directed by Carlo Borghesio and starring Aldo Fabrizi, Peppino De Filippo and Giulia Rubini.

The film's sets were designed by Flavio Mogherini.

Cast
 Aldo Fabrizi as Giovanni Bellini  
 Peppino De Filippo as Ciccillo  
 Giulia Rubini as Giulietta Bellini  
 Carlo Ninchi as Pietro Carletti  
 Germana Paolieri as Signora Carletti  
 Giacomo Furia as Vincenzo, il sarto  
 Ilse Peterson as Figlia di Carletti  
 Loris Gizzi as Un invitato  
 Leonardo Botta as Enrico Carletti  
 Vincenzo Talarico as Lorenzucci  
 Mario Siletti 
 Lidia Martora 
 Rosita Pisano 
 Lia Reiner 
 Pietro Carloni
 Ugo Sasso

References

Bibliography
 Adriano Pintaldi. Aldo Fabrizi: arte romana : al cinema e in cucina. Maggioli Editore, 2012.

External links

1955 films
1955 comedy films
Italian comedy films
1950s Italian-language films
Films directed by Carlo Borghesio
Films scored by Carlo Rustichelli
Films set in Rome
Films with screenplays by Mario Amendola
Italian black-and-white films
1950s Italian films